Boxted could refer to

Boxted, Essex, a village and civil parish in the Colchester district of Essex, England
Boxted, Suffolk, a village and civil parish in the Babergh district of Suffolk, England
RAF Boxted, a former World War II airfield in England